Chris Barnes (born December 29, 1967) is an American death metal vocalist. He is noted for his low guttural vocals and explicitly violent lyrics. He was the co-founder, original lead vocalist and songwriter of Cannibal Corpse from 1988 to 1995, later working as part of Six Feet Under, and has appeared on Torture Killer's second album Swarm! Barnes designed the original Cannibal Corpse logo, the Six Feet Under logo and also created the artwork for Warpath, released in 1997.

Career

Early career
Barnes started his career at the age of 19. His first band was a death/thrash band called Tirant Sin, which was formed in 1986 in his hometown of Buffalo, New York. Other members of Tirant Sin included Paul Mazurkiewicz (drums), Bob Rusay, Cam V and Joe Morelli (guitars) and Rich Ziegler (bass guitar). In 1986, Barnes left Tirant Sin to join another New York-based death/thrash metal band named Leviathan that recorded the four-track demo "Legions of the Undead" in 1987, re-released on the 2005 Six Feet Under box set A Decade in the Grave.

Tirant Sin recorded three demos, all privately released: "Desecration of the Graves" in February 1987, "Chaotic Destruction" in fall 1987 with Dennis John on vocals, and "Mutant Supremacy" in 1988. Barnes appeared only on the third demo, when he re-joined Tirant Sin in January 1988.

1988–1995: Cannibal Corpse
Barnes wrote all of the lyrics on the albums Butchered at Birth, Tomb of the Mutilated, and The Bleeding and wrote the lyrics on Eaten Back to Life with the rest of the band helping.

Barnes left Cannibal Corpse in 1995 because of personal differences with the rest of the band. His final vocal recordings with the band were for the "Created to Kill" sessions which were later re-recorded by his replacement George Fisher for the Vile album. The "Created to Kill" demo featuring Barnes was eventually released as part of the 15 Year Killing Spree box set released in 2003.

He was then able to devote his full attention to the band Six Feet Under, which had been his side project since 1993. Barnes has commented that he is "very proud of what I've done with them".

"Being booted out of Cannibal Corpse was pretty memorable but in a good way. I didn't feel I was able to write the way I wanted to so it was a good transition for me."

It was speculated that Barnes was returning to Cannibal Corpse, which was denied by Alex Webster: "We have no plans to do anything with Chris Barnes ever again. It's not something any of us are interested in doing." "It's nothing against him, but we prefer to move forward rather than live in the past."

1995–present: Six Feet Under

In 2005, Six Feet Under released 13, their sixth full-length album, produced by Barnes. In the same year, Six Feet Under released A Decade in the Grave, a box set highlighting the previous ten years of Six Feet Under.

With the success of two death metal bands already under his belt (Cannibal Corpse and Six Feet Under), Barnes joined the Finnish death metal band Torture Killer in fall 2005. At the time, Barnes said he was fully committed to the band, and appeared on the band's second album Swarm!, which was released on February 24, 2006. However, he left the band in January 2008.

Six Feet Under released the album Commandment on April 17, 2007, to highly positive views. Barnes has said that Commandment is his favorite album, claiming to have received over 5,000 messages in support. Many fans cite it as their favorite Six Feet Under release since Bringer of Blood in 2003.

On November 11, 2008, Six Feet Under released another album, Death Rituals. It saw the band returning to Morrisound Studios in Tampa, Florida, with Chris Carroll producing and mixing by Toby Wright (Slayer, Korn, In Flames, Fear Factory, etc.) and the return of old friend Bill Metoyer, who recorded the band's CD Warpath, who helped out with recording of the drums. The album has thirteen songs including a cover version of Mötley Crüe's "Bastard" and the ambient song "Crossroads to Armageddon".

On January 16, 2009, a message appeared on Six Feet Under's website saying, Just wanted to let all of our fans know that we are currently in the studio working on Graveyard Classics 3. We are about 60% finished with tracking. Everything is going great and we are having a lot of fun laying these new songs down. more info and track listing to come!!

In November 2011, Rob Arnold and Matt DeVries posted statements saying they had left Chimaira to play in Six Feet Under full-time. However, in 2012, DeVries moved on to Fear Factory, replacing longtime bass guitarist Byron Stroud. The vacant position was subsequently filled by the ex-Brain Drill 7-string bass guitarist, Jeff Hughell.

The band's ninth studio album, Undead, was released on May 22, 2012. It was announced on the same day that Rob Arnold would be replaced by Ola Englund. The band said that Arnold would remain a central writing partner and collaborator on future Six Feet Under releases.

Six Feet Under's tenth album Unborn was released on March 19, 2013, and their eleventh record Crypt of the Devil was released May 5, 2015.

Social involvement

Support for marijuana law reform
Since leaving Cannibal Corpse after The Bleeding, Barnes slightly shifted his lyrical focus towards more socio-political issues, the most prominent of which was the legalization of marijuana. The album Warpath contains two songs pertaining to marijuana: "4:20", which praises the effects of the plant and "Caged and Disgraced" which questions the detention of individuals for marijuana possession. Included in the album's liner notes is the website for the National Organization for the Reform of Marijuana Laws and it is pointed out that the song "4:20" (which is 4 minutes and 20 seconds in length) was recorded on April 20 at 4:20 pm, the national day and traditional time for smoking marijuana.

Maximum Violence contains the song "Victim of the Paranoid". which is another examination of marijuana laws, asserting that marijuana users are victims of a system that is too worried about marijuana users and neglects other more pressing issues.

Feud with Seth Putnam 
There was friction between Barnes and Anal Cunt's former vocalist Seth Putnam. According to Putnam's now-defunct website (due to his death in 2011), Putnam heckled Barnes during a Six Feet Under set, leading to an altercation between the two ending with Six Feet Under's roadies ganging up on Putnam while Barnes fled to his tour bus. Putnam released the song "Chris Barnes Is a Pussy" as retaliation to the incident.

Despite the feud, Putnam stated that "Murdered in the Basement" was his favorite song by Six Feet Under.

Discography
Six Feet Under
 Haunted (1995)
 Alive and Dead (1996)
 Warpath (1997)
Maximum Violence (1999)
Graveyard Classics (2000)
True Carnage (2001)
Bringer of Blood (2003)
Graveyard Classics 2 (2004)
13 (2005)
Commandment (2007)
Death Rituals (2008)
Graveyard Classics 3 (2010)
Undead (2012)
Unborn  (2013)
Crypt of the Devil (2015)
Graveyard Classics IV: The Number of the Priest (2016)
Torment (2017)
 Unburied (2018)
Nightmares of the Decomposed (2020)

Cannibal Corpse
Cannibal Corpse demo (1989)
Eaten Back to Life (1990)
Butchered at Birth (1991)
Tomb of the Mutilated (1992)
Hammer Smashed Face EP (1993)
The Bleeding (1994)
Created to Kill (Vile demo) (1995)
15 Year Killing Spree box set (2003)
Centuries of Torment: The First 20 Years video (2008)

Torture Killer
Swarm! (2006)
Phobia (2013) Backing vocals on "Written in Blood"

IHATE
IHATE (2014)

Cannabis Corpse
From Wisdom to Baked (2014) Backing vocals on "Individual Pot Patterns"

Gorguts
Considered Dead (1991) Backing vocals on "Bodily Corrupted", "Rottenatomy" & "Hematological Allergy"

Skribbal
Black Eyed Children (2021)
Opening introduction on "The Retribution"

Incite
 Built to Destroy (2019) Backing vocals on "Poisoned by Power"

References

External links

American male singers
American heavy metal singers
1967 births
20th-century American singers
21st-century American singers
Living people
Death metal musicians
Musicians from Buffalo, New York
Cannibal Corpse members
Six Feet Under (band) members